Skeleton Skeletron is the sixth studio album from Swedish band Tiamat.

Following A Deeper Kind of Slumber, the band took a less ambiguous direction to their style, utilizing a Gothic rock sound but with various atmospheric soundscapes/effects and female background vocals added in.

"Church of Tiamat" (Track #1) is also the name of the band's official website.

The end of the song "As Long as You Are Mine" includes a quote of the opening of French poet Jean de La Fontaine's fable Le Loup et l’Agneau (The Wolf and the Lamb).  The end of the song "Lucy" contains a popular sample from the 1957 science-fiction film The Brain from Planet Arous.

Track listing

Personnel
Johan Edlund – vocals, guitar & keys
Anders Iwers – bass
Lars Sköld – drums

Additional vocals by Nicole Bolley, Andrea Schwarz & Jessica Andree.
Piano by Stefan Gerbe.

Charts

References

1999 albums
Tiamat (band) albums